African River is a 1989 album by South African jazz pianist Abdullah Ibrahim..

Reception

The AllMusic reviewer praised the album, commenting: "more important than the individual players are the colorful ensembles and the frequently memorable compositions". The Penguin Guide to Jazz described it as "absolutely superb and a vivid extension of the kind of arrangements Ibrahim had attempted on African Space Program".

Track listing 
 "Toi-Toi" – 3:27 
 "African River" – 9:44 
 "Joan – Capetown Flower" – 5:46
 "Chisa" – 4:24
 "Sweet Samba" – 5:52
 "Duke 88" – 8:27
 "The Wedding" – 3:54
 "The Mountain Of The Night" – 3:33

Personnel 
 Abdullah Ibrahim – piano, leader
 Horace A. Young – alto saxophone
 John Stubblefield – tenor saxophone
 Robin Eubanks – trombone
 Howard Johnson – baritone saxophone. tuba, trumpet
 Buster Williams – bass
 Brian Abrahams – drums

References

1989 albums
Abdullah Ibrahim albums
Enja Records albums
Albums recorded at Van Gelder Studio